Qui Nhơn Airfield (also known as Qui Nhơn Airport, Qui Nhơn Air Base or Qui Nhon Army Airfield) is a former United States Air Force, United States Army and Vietnam Air Force airfield located in Qui Nhon in Binh Dinh Province, Vietnam.

History

In April 1966 the 84th Construction Battalion built a  extension to the runway. In early 1967 the RMK-BRJ construction firm built a  taxiway extension and various support buildings.

The 1883d Communications Squadron designated and organized at Qui Nhon Airfield, South Vietnam, 1 November 1965, forming part of the 1964th Communications Group. It then moved to Phu Cat Air Base on 1 April 1967.

Army units based at Qui Nhơn included:
 8th Transportation Company (Piasecki CH-21C Shawnee) (1961-?)
 57th Medical Detachment (Helicopter Ambulance) (UH-1B Huey) from March 1963.
 A platoon of 498th Medical Company (Air Ambulance) with UH-1D Hueys from October 1965.
 498th Medical Company (Air Ambulance) (UH-1D) from 1967.
 18th Aviation Company
 61st Assault Helicopter Company
 92nd Aviation Company
 117th Aviation Company
 Company D, 52nd Infantry Regiment (from December 1966)
 67th Evacuation Hospital (October 1966 - January 1971)
 1098th Transportation Company (Medium Boat)

USAF units based at Qui Nhơn included:
15th Aerial Port Squadron
21st Tactical Air Support Squadron (detachments)
619th Tactical Control Squadron Detachment 12 (December 1965-November 1966)

Current use
The base is now covered with commercial buildings while the former runway is now Nguyễn Tất Thành road.  The city is served commercially by Phu Cat Airport.

Accidents and incidents
 18 September 1965 USAF Lockheed C-130A Hercules #55-0038 crashed into the sea while on final approach killing 4 of 11 crew and passengers
 30 June 1966 USAF Fairchild C-123B Provider #54-0644 was damaged beyond repair at Qui Nhơn
 30 November 1967 USAF de Havilland Canada C-7B Caribou #62-4175 on approach to Qui Nhơn diverted due to bad weather and hit a mountain 5 km south of the base killing all 26 passengers and crew
 25 May 1970 U.S. Army Beechcraft U-21A #66-18026 was damaged beyond repair at Qui Nhơn

See also

 Republic of Vietnam Air Force
 United States Pacific Air Forces
 Seventh Air Force

References

Installations of the United States Air Force in South Vietnam
Air force installations of South Vietnam
Installations of the United States Army in South Vietnam
Buildings and structures in Bình Định province